Ritmo nuevo y vieja ola is a 1965 Argentine film directed by Enrique Carreras. It was written by Julio Porter. It premiered on 19 August 1965.

Plot
The film is divided in three parts: New wave (Vieja Ola), Eternal wave (Ola eterna) and Old wave (Nueva Ola).

Cast
 Roberto Airaldi as Pena
 Toño Andreu
 Guillermo Battaglia
 Augusto Bonardo
 Héctor Calcaño
 Osvaldo Canónico
 Chispita Carreras
 Marisita Carreras as Marisita
 Mercedes Carreras as Delia
 Quique Carreras
 José Comellas
 Guido Gorgatti
 Santiago Gómez Cou
 Ángel Magaña
 Antonio Martiáñez
 Ubaldo Martínez
 Tita Merello
 Estela Molly
 Elvira Olivera Garcés
 Alberto Olmedo
 Rodolfo Onetto
 Fidel Pintos
 Javier Portales
 Pedro Quartucci
 Dean Reed as himself
 Susana Rubio
 Jorge Salcedo as Gustavo de Castro
 Ignacio de Soroa
 Norberto Suárez
 Lolita Torres as Raquel Mejía
 Tristán Díaz Ocampo
 Darío Vittori

Reception 
King in El Mundo wrote, "The show is, in general terms, brilliant".

El Cronista Comercial reviewed the film, writing the following about the close: "At the end in a quite objectionable scene, Tita Merello sings a tango and the film ends with a photograph of Gardel, there are many spectators who applaud".

Un diccionario de films argentinos summarized it as: "In the same style as Esto es Alegria, a comedy sketch, a romance sketch and a melancholic third. Cast full of names and libretto lacking in ideas".

References

External links 
 

1965 films
1960s Spanish-language films
Argentine black-and-white films
1960s Argentine films